Carlos Simon (born 1986) is an African-American composer of Western classical music.

Born in Washington, D.C. and raised in Atlanta, Simon is the son of a preacher and grew up in a household where he was forbidden to listen to anything other than gospel music; he has described gospel's improvisatory nature as a critical influence in the development of his own compositional style, alongside the more formal elements of the work of such composers as Ludwig van Beethoven and Johannes Brahms. Beginning at the age of ten he played piano for Sunday services at his father's church, at which point he began formal piano lessons as well. Later in life he spent time as keyboardist and musical director for R&B artists Angie Stone and Jennifer Holliday. He completed degrees at Morehouse College and Georgia State University before attending the University of Michigan for doctoral studies with Michael Daugherty and Evan Chambers. Formerly on the music faculty of Spelman College and Morehouse College, in 2019 he became an assistant professor in the Department of Performing Arts at Georgetown University.

Simon's music is informed by his interest in social justice issues, and frequently incorporates activist themes in his work; such pieces include Elegy for string quartet, honoring the memories of Trayvon Martin, Michael Brown and Eric Garner, and Requiem for the Enslaved, in which African-American spirituals are combined with the Latin mass and elements of hip hop to tell the story of the 1838 sale of slaves to discharge the debts of Georgetown University. Other compositions are inspired by the work of visual artists, such as Bill Traylor and Romare Bearden.

In 2021, Simon received the Sphinx Medal of Excellence from the Sphinx Organization, becoming only the second composer to receive the award; that same year he joined the John F. Kennedy Center for the Performing Arts as composer-in-residence. In 2018 he was named as a Sundance/Time Warner Composer Fellow by the Sundance Institute. Among the organizations from which he has received commissions and performances are the New York Philharmonic, the Los Angeles Philharmonic, Los Angeles Opera, the Philadelphia Orchestra, the Boston Symphony Orchestra, Washington National Opera, the Reno Philharmonic Orchestra, the American Composers Orchestra, and the National Symphony Orchestra.

References

1986 births
Living people
21st-century American composers
21st-century classical composers
African-American classical composers
American classical composers
African-American male classical composers
21st-century African-American musicians
Classical musicians from Washington, D.C.
Musicians from Atlanta
Classical musicians from Georgia (U.S. state)
Morehouse College alumni
University of Michigan School of Music, Theatre & Dance alumni
Spelman College faculty
Morehouse College faculty
Georgetown University faculty
American male classical composers
21st-century American male musicians